Jeanny Marc-Mathiasin (born 2 December 1950 in Deshaies, Guadeloupe) is a member of the National Assembly of France.  She represented Guadeloupe's 3rd constituency on the Caribbean island of Guadeloupe,  and was a member of United Guadeloupe, Solidary and Responsible and sat as part of the Socialiste, radical, citoyen et divers gauche group.

References
 page on the French National Assembly website

1950 births
Living people
People from Deshaies
Guadeloupean politicians
United Guadeloupe, Solidary and Responsible politicians
Deputies of the 13th National Assembly of the French Fifth Republic
Guadeloupean socialists